Hazel Creek is a stream in Audrain County in the U.S. state of Missouri. It is a tributary of Littleby Creek.

Hazel Creek was named for the hazel along its course.

See also
List of rivers of Missouri

References

Rivers of Audrain County, Missouri
Rivers of Missouri